Orval-sur-Sienne is a commune in the department of Manche, northwestern France. The municipality was established on 1 January 2016 by merger of the former communes of Montchaton and Orval.

See also 
Communes of the Manche department

References 

Communes of Manche
Populated places established in 2016
2016 establishments in France